The women's 1500 metres race of the 2013 World Single Distance Speed Skating Championships was held on 22 March at 15:55 local time.

Results

References

Women 01500
World